Andrej Goršek (born 21 October 1970) is a Slovenian retired international footballer who played as a forward.

Career
Goršek was capped once by the Slovenian national team, in a 1997 loss against Bosnia and Herzegovina.

References

External links
 Player profile at NZS 
 

1970 births
Living people
Slovenian footballers
Association football forwards
NK Celje players
NK Dravograd players
NK Rudar Velenje players
Slovenian PrvaLiga players
Slovenia international footballers